The 1992 World Figure Skating Championships were held at the Oakland-Alameda County Coliseum Arena in Oakland, California, USA from March 24 to 29. Medals were awarded in men's singles, ladies' singles, pair skating, and ice dancing.

Medal tables

Medalists

Medals by country

Results

Men

Ladies

Pairs

Ice dancing

External links
 results

World Figure Skating Championships
World Figure Skating Championships
World Figure Skating Championships
International figure skating competitions hosted by the United States
World Figure Skating Championships
International sports competitions in California
World Figure Skating Championships
20th century in Oakland, California
Sports competitions in Oakland, California